Narathorn Srichaphan (born 5 August 1972) is a former professional tennis player from Thailand.

Biography
Srichaphan was a boys' doubles quarter-finalist at the 1990 Wimbledon Championships, beating Andriy Medvedev en route. 

He represented Thailand in Asian Games and Southeast Asian Games competition during his career. A multiple Southeast Asian Games gold medalist, he also won a gold medal at the 1998 Asian Games, partnering younger brother Paradorn in the doubles.

His only ATP Tour main draw appearance came in the doubles at the 2003 Thailand Open, where he and brother Paradorn made the quarter-finals as wildcards.

He featured in a total of 29 Davis Cup ties for Thailand, the last in 2003.

References

External links
 
 
 

1972 births
Living people
Narathorn Srichaphan
Narathorn Srichaphan
Narathorn Srichaphan
Southeast Asian Games medalists in tennis
Tennis players at the 1994 Asian Games
Tennis players at the 1998 Asian Games
Tennis players at the 2002 Asian Games
Narathorn Srichaphan
Asian Games medalists in tennis
Medalists at the 1998 Asian Games
Competitors at the 1991 Southeast Asian Games